Prophysaon andersoni, common name the reticulate taildropper, is a species of air-breathing land slug, a terrestrial pulmonate gastropod mollusk in the family Arionidae, the roundback slugs.

These slugs are notable for being able to self-amputate (autotomy) a portion of their tail.

Description
Adults of this slug species are about 50 mm when active, but can exceed 60 mm in length. The color of the body is a grayish or reddish brown, or can be yellowish. The dorsum is furrowed with a reticulated pattern like a mesh of diamond shapes. The mantle of the slug has two dark lateral bands. The mucus is yellow or orange.

Distribution 
This species of slug occurs in North America, including California, Oregon and part of Montana.

References

External links 
 information about Prophysaon andersoni: http://www.livinglandscapes.bc.ca/cbasin/molluscs/arionidae.html
 Prophysaon sp. 1 A Terrestrial Slug. NatureServe Explorer.

Arionidae
Gastropods described in 1872